The 2010 Kentucky Indy 300 was the eleventh running of the Kentucky Indy 300 and the fifteenth round of the 2010 IndyCar Series season. It took place on Saturday, September 4, 2010. The race contested over 200 laps at the  Kentucky Speedway in Sparta, Kentucky.

Classification

Qualifying

Race

References

2010 in IndyCar
2010
2010 in sports in Kentucky
September 2010 sports events in the United States